Elmo is a city in Nodaway County, Missouri, United States. The population was 168 at the 2010 census.

History
Elmo was platted in 1879, when the railroad was extended to that point.  The community most likely was named after the novel St. Elmo. A post office called Elmo has been in operation since 1886.

Geography
Elmo is located at  (40.518773, -95.117406).

Demographics

2010 census
As of the census of 2010, there were 168 people, 71 households, and 43 families living in the city. The racial makeup of the city was 97.0% White, 1.2% Native American, and 1.8% from two or more races.

There were 71 households, of which 32.4% had children under the age of 18 living with them, 46.5% were married couples living together, 8.5% had a female householder with no husband present, 5.6% had a male householder with no wife present, and 39.4% were non-families. 31.0% of all households were made up of individuals, and 16.9% had someone living alone who was 65 years of age or older. The average household size was 2.37 and the average family size was 3.02.

The median age in the city was 38.7 years. 19.6% of residents were under the age of 18; 16.7% were between the ages of 18 and 24; 23.3% were from 25 to 44; 24.4% were from 45 to 64; and 16.1% were 65 years of age or older. The gender makeup of the city was 51.2% male and 48.8% female.

2000 census
As of the census of 2000, there were 166 people, 78 households, and 45 families living in the city. The population density was 771.2 people per square mile (291.3/km2). There were 95 housing units at an average density of 441.4 per square mile (166.7/km2). The racial makeup of the city was 100.00% White.

There were 78 households, out of which 24.4% had children under the age of 18 living with them, 47.4% were married couples living together, 7.7% had a female householder with no husband present, and 42.3% were non-families. 41.0% of all households were made up of individuals, and 25.6% had someone living alone who was 65 years of age or older. The average household size was 2.13 and the average family size was 2.87.

In the city the population was spread out, with 25.3% under the age of 18, 6.0% from 18 to 24, 22.9% from 25 to 44, 21.7% from 45 to 64, and 24.1% who were 65 years of age or older. The median age was 42 years. For every 100 females there were 84.4 males. For every 100 females age 18 and over, there were 85.1 males.

The median income for a household in the city was $20,833, and the median income for a family was $27,500. Males had a median income of $25,417 versus $9,375 for females. The per capita income for the city was $12,966. About 15.6% of families and 24.2% of the population were below the poverty line, including 28.9% of those under the age of eighteen and 16.7% of those 65 or over.

References

Cities in Nodaway County, Missouri
Cities in Missouri